I'll Be Your Sweetheart is a 1945 British historical musical film directed by Val Guest and starring Margaret Lockwood, Vic Oliver and Michael Rennie. It was the first and only musical film produced by Gainsborough Studios. Commissioned by the British Ministry of Information, it was set at the beginning of the 20th century, and was about the composers of popular music hall songs fighting for a new copyright law that will protect them from having their songs stolen. Copyright scholar Adrian Johns has called the film "propaganda" and "a one-dimensional account of the piracy crisis [about sheet music in the early 20th century] from the publishers' perspective", but also highlighted its value as historical document, with large parts of the dialogue "closely culled from the actual raids, court cases, and arguments of 1900-1905."

Plot
In 1900 Bob Fielding arrives in London from the north of England determined to make it as a song publisher. He visits a music hall where he hears Edie Story singing "Oh Mr Porter" by George Le Brunn.

Songwriters Kahn and Kelly sell their latest song, "I'll Be Your Sweetheart" to Jim Knight, who also wants to be a publisher. Knight doesn't give them an advance so they sell it to Jim. This causes a rivalry between Bob and Jim, which is increased when both men fall in love with Edie.

Bob leads a movement to smash the music pirates. He asks Edie to speak out against them but she refuses, reluctant to get involved with what she sees is a political issue. However when composer Le Brunn dies impoverished, Edie makes an on-stage appeal to her audience to fight piracy.

Eventually the copyright bill is passed with the help of MP T.P. O'Connor. Bob leads a group of song writers to smash the printing presses of the pirates, resulting in a large brawl where Bob and his allies are victorious.

Bob and Edie decide to get married. Bob and Jim bury the hatchet as the copyright bill is passed.

Cast
 Margaret Lockwood as Edie Story
 Vic Oliver as Sam Kahn  
 Michael Rennie as Bob Fielding 
 Peter Graves as Jim Knight 
 Moore Marriott as George Le Brunn
 Frederick Burtwell as Pacey  
 Garry Marsh as Wallace  
 George Merritt as T.P. O'Connor  
 Muriel George as Mrs. Le Brunn 
 Ella Retford as Dresser 
 Joss Ambler as Dugan  
 Eliot Makeham as John Friar 
 Maudie Edwards as Mrs. Jones 
 Jonathan Field as Kelly  
 Deryck Guyler as Politician 
 Gordon McLeod as Prime Minister  
 Arthur Young as Judge  
 Dave Crowley as 1st. Henchman 
 Alf Goddard as 2nd. Henchman  
 Jack Vyvian as 3rd Henchman

Production
The film was based on the real life copyright battles of Abbott and Preston in the early 1900s. Val Guest, the writer-director, was familiar with these struggles having been a former songwriter.

Margaret Lockwood's singing voice was dubbed by Maudie Edwards. It was a rare musical from her.

Vic Oliver was billed above the title, just below Margaret Lockwood. However his role was fairly minor. It was the first major part for Michael Rennie who is given an "and introducing" credit in the film's opening credits.

Songs
"I'll Be Your Sweetheart" by Harry Dacre
"Oh! Mr Porter"  by Thomas and George Le Brunn
"Honeysuckle and the Bee" by W H Penn and A H Fitz
"I Wouldn't Leave My Little Wooden Hut" by Tom Mellor and Charlies Collins
"Liza Johnson" by George Le Brunn and Edgar Bateman
"I'm Banking Everything On You", "Sooner or Later" and "Mary Anna" by Manning Sherwin and Val Guest

Reception

Box Office
According to Kinematograph Weekly the film performed well at the British box office in 1945.  The 'biggest winners' at the box office in 1945 Britain were The Seventh Veil, with "runners up" being (in release order), Madonna of the Seven Moons, Old Acquaintance, Frenchman's Creek, Mrs Parkington, Arsenic and Old Lace, Meet Me in St Louis, A Song to Remember, Since You Went Away, Here Come the Waves, Tonight and Every Night, Hollywood Canteen, They Were Sisters, The Princess and the Pirate, The Adventures of Susan, National Velvet, Mrs Skefflington, I Live in Grosvenor Square, Nob Hill, Perfect Strangers, Valley of Decision, Conflict and Duffy's Tavern. British "runners up" were They Were Sisters, I Live in Grosvenor Square, Perfect Strangers, Madonna of the Seven Moons, Waterloo Road, Blithe Spirit, The Way to the Stars, I'll Be Your Sweetheart, Dead of Night, Waltz Time and Henry V. However Gainsborough Studios made no further musicals.

Critical
In the Radio Times, David Parkinson wrote, "Val Guest directs with brio, but the songs he's saddled with are decidedly second-rate"; while in The Independent, Tom Vallance described the film as an "under-rated musical...a film that combined the pace and vitality of the best Fox musicals with a trenchant look at flourishing music piracy at the turn of the century."

Adaptation
The film was adapted for radio on the BBC in 1945.

References

Bibliography
 Cook, Pam. Gainsborough Pictures. Cassell, 1997.
 Harper, Sue. Picturing the Past: The Rise and Fall of the British Costume Film. British Film Institute, 1994.
 Murphy, Robert. Realism and Tinsel: Cinema and Society in Britain, 1939-1949. Routledge, 1989.

External links

I'll Be Your Sweetheart at British Film Institute
Review of film at Variety
I'll Be Your Sweetheart at TCMDB

1945 films
British historical musical films
British black-and-white films
1940s historical musical films
1940s English-language films
Films directed by Val Guest
Gainsborough Pictures films
Films set in London
Films set in the 1900s
1940s British films